Laura Jones (born 4 January 1983) is a Welsh hammer thrower.

Jones was born in Wrexham.  Her personal best throw is 64.74 metres, achieved in August 2010 in Hendon. This places her seventh on the British outdoor all-time list, behind Lorraine Shaw, Shirley Webb, Zoe Derham, Carys Parry, Sophie Hitchon and Sarah Holt. Jones is also ranked second all-time amongst Welsh throwers, behind Parry. She represented Wales at the Commonwealth Games for a third consecutive time in 2010. Laura now teaches at a primary school in Cheshire. Since this series of events, she has been married and is now known as Laura Jones.

International competitions

References
2006 Commonwealth Games profile

1983 births
Living people
Sportspeople from Wrexham
British female hammer throwers
Welsh hammer throwers
Welsh female athletes
Commonwealth Games competitors for Wales
Athletes (track and field) at the 2002 Commonwealth Games
Athletes (track and field) at the 2006 Commonwealth Games
Athletes (track and field) at the 2010 Commonwealth Games